The 1986 Swedish Open was a men's tennis tournament played on outdoor clay courts held in Båstad, Sweden and was part of the Grand Prix circuit of the 1986 Tour. It was the 39th edition of the tournament and was held from 21 July through 27 July 1986. Sixth-seeded Emilio Sánchez won the singles title.

Finals

Singles
 Emilio Sánchez defeated  Mats Wilander 7–6, 4–6, 6–4

Doubles
 Sergio Casal /  Emilio Sánchez defeated  Craig Campbell /  Joey Rive 6–4, 6–2

References

External links
 ITF tournament edition details

Swedish Open
Swedish Open
Swedish Open
Swedish Open